Kozłowski is a Polish coat of arms. It was used by the Kozłowski szlachta family in the times of the Polish–Lithuanian Commonwealth.

Polish coats of arms